The 2019–20 season was Monaco's seventh consecutive season in Ligue 1 since promotion from Ligue 2 in 2013. Monaco finished the season in ninth position, on 1.43 points per game, after the season was ended on 30 April by the Ligue de Football Professionnel due to the COVID-19 pandemic in France. In the Coupe de France, Monaco were eliminated in the round of 16 by Saint-Étienne. In the Coupe de la Ligue, Monaco were eliminated by Lille in the same stage.

Season events

Transfers

Summer
On 13 June, AS Monaco announced that Ronaël Pierre-Gabriel would join Mainz 05 on 1 July when the transfer window opens. On 20 June, AS Monaco announced that Guevin Tormin would join Châteauroux on 1 July when the transfer window opens.

On 26 June, Khéphren Thuram moved to Derby de la Côte d'Azur rivals Nice.

On 28 June, AS Monaco announced that they had decided not to extend the contract of Andrea Raggi and that he would leave the club. The following day, 29 June, Álvaro Fernández left AS Monaco to sign for Spanish club Huesca.

On 1 July, AS Monaco announced that Gelson Martins had joined the club permanently on a five-year contract, having previously been on loan at the club from Atlético Madrid since January 2019. Also on 1 July, Kévin N'Doram joined Metz on a season-long loan, while Giulian Biancone and Loïc Badiashile moved to Cercle Brugge on season-long loans. The following day, 2 July, Adrien Bongiovanni returned to Cercle Brugge for a second season on loan at the club. 

On 5 July, Julien Serrano also moved on loan to Cercle Brugge until the end of the season.

On 8 July, Youri Tielemans left AS Monaco to join Leicester City on a permanent transfer, while Ibrahima Diallo moved permanently to Brest, where he had been on loan the previous season.

On 10 July, Antonio Barreca moved to Genoa on a season-long loan deal with an option to join Genoa outright at the end of the season.

On 15 July, AS Monaco signed Benjamin Lecomte on a five-year contract for an undisclosed fee from Montpellier, and sent Jordi Mboula on loan to Cercle Brugge until the end of the season.

On 23 July, Paul Nardi left AS Monaco to sign for Lorient, while Samuel Grandsir moved to Brest on a season-long loan deal.

On 1 August, Jean-Eudes Aholou moved to Saint-Étienne on a season-long loan deal. On 5 August, Han-Noah Massengo made a permanent move to Bristol City.

On 6 August, AS Monaco announced the signing of Ruben Aguilar on a five-year contract from Montpellier, and that Pelé had joined Reading on a season-long loan. The following day, 7 August, Djibril Sidibé moved to Everton on a season-long loan deal.

On 11 August, Nacer Chadli joined Anderlecht on a season-long loan deal, while Hannibal Mejbri joined Manchester United outright.

On 12 August, Irvin Cardona moved to Brest, and Henry Onyekuru signed from Everton on a five-year contract.

On 14 August, AS Monaco announced the signing of Wissam Ben Yedder to a five-year contract from Sevilla, while Rony Lopes moved in the opposite direction.

On 21 August, AS Monaco announced the signing of Islam Slimani on a season-long loan deal from Leicester City.

On 23 August Adrien Silva returned to AS Monaco on a season-long loan deal from Leicester City. The following day, 24 August, Guillermo Maripán signed on a five-year contract from Alavés.

On 28 August, Franco Antonucci left AS Monaco to sign for Volendam on a season-long loan deal,. with Arthur Zagre signing on a three-year contract from Paris Saint-Germain the following day.

On 30 August, Jonathan Panzo and Lyle Foster both moved on season-long loan deals to Cercle Brugge. The following day, AS Monaco announced the signing of Tiémoué Bakayoko on a season-long loan deal with an option to purchase outright, and that Adama Traoré had joined Metz on a season-long loan deal.

On 1 September, AS Monaco announced the season-long loan signing of Jean-Kévin Augustin from RB Leipzig, with an option to make the move permanent in the summer of 2020.

On 2 September, Robert Navarro left AS Monaco to join Real Sociedad on a permanent transfer, and Wilson Isidor moved to Laval on loan for the season. Also on 2 September, Dinis Almeida joined Lokomotiv Plovdiv outright, while Radamel Falcao joined Galatasaray.

On 17 September, Sofiane Diop joined Sochaux on loan until the end of the season.

Winter
On 3 January, AS Monaco announced the signing of Strahinja Pavlović from Partizan on a contract until June 2024 while remaining at Partizan on loan for the remainder of the season.

On 5 January, Henry Onyekuru moved to Galatasaray on loan for the remainder of the season.

On 17 January, Naldo left AS Monaco by mutual consent.

On 27 January, Jean-Kévin Augustin left AS Monaco after his loan from RB Leipzig was ended early.

On 29 January, AS Monaco announced the signing of Radosław Majecki, from Legia Warsaw, Aurélien Tchouaméni from Bordeaux and Youssouf Fofana from Strasbourg all on contracts until June 2024. Majecki stayed at Legia Warsaw on loan for the remainder of the season, while Jordi Mboula had joined Huesca on loan until the end of season after his loan deal at Cercle Brugge had ended.

On 30 January, AS Monaco announced the signing of Jean Marcelin from Auxerre on a contract until June 2024.

On 31 January, Gil Dias moved to Granada on loan for the remainder of the season.

Contract extensions
On 1 July, Chrislain Matsima signed his first professional contract with AS Monaco.

August
On 11 August, sports director Michael Emenalo left AS Monaco by mutual consent.

December
On 28 December, Leonardo Jardim left his role as head coach of AS Monaco, with Robert Moreno being announced as his replacement on a contract until June 2022 the same day.

March
On 13 March, the Ligue de Football Professionnel ("LFP") suspended Ligue 1 and Ligue 2 indefinitely following the outbreak of coronavirus in France.

April
On 28 April, it was announced that Ligue 1 would not resume after all sporting events in France were banned until September. Two days later, on 30 April, the LFP declared the season finished due to the COVID-19 pandemic in France, with Monaco finishing in ninth position after positions were decided on points per game.

June
On 25 June, Everton announced that they had agreed a deal with AS Monaco to extend the loan of Djibril Sidibé until the end of their season. On 29 June, AS Monaco confirmed this, along with Gil Dias' loan being extended until the end of the 2019–20 La Liga season.

July
On 1 July, AS Monaco confirmed that the loan deals for Pelé, Jordi Mboula and Antonio Barreca had all been extended until the end of their respective seasons.

Squad

Out on loan

Reserves

Transfers

In

Loans in

Out

 Transfers announced on the above date, become official when the transfer window opens on 1 July.

Loans out

Released

Friendlies

Competitions

Overview

Ligue 1

League table

Results summary

Results by matches

Results
The Ligue 1 schedule was announced on 14 June 2019.

Coupe de France

Coupe de la Ligue

Statistics

Appearances and goals

|-
|colspan="14"|Players away from the club on loan:

|-
|colspan="14"|Players who appeared for Monaco no longer at the club:

|}

Goalscorers

Clean sheets

Disciplinary record

|-
|colspan="17"|Players away on loan:

References

AS Monaco FC seasons
AS Monaco
Monaco